The 43rd government of Turkey (12 November 1979 – 11 September 1980) was a minority government led by Süleyman Demirel of Justice Party (AP).

The elections
The 42nd government of Turkey came to an end because of the defeat of Bülent Ecevit's CHP in by-elections. However, CHP was still the largest party in the parliament, and Süleyman Demirel could not found a coalition government. Instead, he asked for the support of the other parties, which were reluctant to participate in the government. Finally, Necmettin Erbakan of the National Salvation Party agreed to support the minority government of AP.

The government
In the list below, the serving period of cabinet members who served only a part of the cabinet's lifespan are shown in the column "Notes".

Aftermath
The government ended with the 1980 Turkish coup d'état.

References

Cabinets of Turkey
Justice Party (Turkey) politicians
1980 disestablishments in Turkey
Minority governments
1979 establishments in Turkey
Cabinets established in 1979
Cabinets disestablished in 1980
Members of the 43rd government of Turkey
16th parliament of Turkey
Justice Party (Turkey)